Soviet Woman (in Russian, Советская женщина; transliterated in English: Sovetskaya zhenshchina) was a sociopolitic and literary illustrated magazine, founded in Moscow in 1945 by the Committee of Soviet Women with the support of the unions.

It was first published in December 1945 in the Soviet Union. It had a bimestrial edition until 1954, when it became monthly until its disappearance in 1991. 

The magazine was published in several languages and distributed in various countries.

The magazine's aim was to inform about different aspects of soviet women's lives, such as their participation in building the communist society, or the problems facing the international feminist movement. They also published articles on fashion, economics or on the achievements of soviet science, especially about medicine and pedagogy, as well as literary and artistic works.

As of 1991 the magazine was published under the name Woman's world (Мир женщины).

See also

 Kommunistka
 Rabotnitsa
 Zhenotdel

References

1945 establishments in the Soviet Union
1991 disestablishments in the Soviet Union
Communist magazines
Magazines published in the Soviet Union
Feminist magazines
Feminism in the Soviet Union
Magazines established in 1945
Magazines disestablished in 1991
Magazines published in Moscow
Russian-language magazines
Monthly magazines published in Russia
Women's magazines published in the Soviet Union